Seim is a village in Alver municipality in Vestland county, Norway. The village is home to Seim Church (Seim kyrkje) which was built in 1878, and a primary school.

History
Harald Fairhair had his royal estates in and around the village of Seim.  According to tradition, his son King Håkon the Good is buried at Håkonhaugen in Seim (Håkonshaugen på Seim). Since 1997, Seim has been a sight of the Håkonarspelet summer festivals which includes performances of the historical drama Kongen med Gullhjelmen.  Written by Johannes Heggland, this series of historic plays centers on the reign of King Håkon the Good which ended with the Battle of Fitjar.

The village of Seim and the surrounding areas going out about  around the village in all directions is the area of the old parish of Seim.  This area historically belonged to the prestegjeld of Hosanger.  Seim was an exclave of Hosanger, since the rest of Hosanger was located further to the south and east and the prestegjeld of Alver separated the two.  In 1885, Seim was transferred to the new municipality of Alversund. In 1964, Alversund was merged with parts of several other municipalities to form a new, larger municipality of Lindås. Then in 2020, the area was incorporated into the new Alver Municipality.

References

External links
Håkonarspelet – Håkonarvarde på Seim i Lindås

Villages in Vestland
Alver (municipality)